Ambara is a 2013 Indian Kannada-language romance film written and directed by Sen Prakash.  The film stars Yogesh and Bhama in the lead roles.

The film was released on 15 November 2013.

Cast
Yogesh as Ajay
Bhama as Arundathi
Harish Raj
Sudha Belawadi
Tilak as Vilas
Vishwa
Sadhu Kokila
Bank Janardhan
Jai Jagadish
Ramakrishna
Padma Vasanthi
Jayasheela
Vinayak Joshi

Production 
A set boy named Sada died while the film was being shot in Haridwar and the nearby Ganges area.

Soundtrack
Music director Abhiman Roy has composed 7 tracks for the movie.

"Lovey Thrillingu" - Tippu, Supriya Lohith
"Saniha Banda Mele" - Sonu Nigam, Yashi
"Hai Hai Re Hai" - Mujipur Rahman, Saindhavi
"Vande Mataram" (bit) - Yashi
"Poli Poli" - Gurukiran, Kiran Sagar, Supriya Lohith
"Kaanade Kaanade" - Anuradha Bhat, Naresh Iyer
"Saniha Banda Mele" (remix) - Soni Nigam, Yashi

Release

Critical reception
A critic from The Times of India rated the film 3 out of 5 and wrote that "Though the script is good, the narration is completely confusing till the climax which has some dramatic sequences". A critic from Rediff.com gave the film a rating of  out of 5 and opined that "Ambara is a disappointing film, moving along predictable lines".

References

External links
Ambara on Sify

2013 films
Films shot in Uttarakhand
2010s Kannada-language films
Indian romance films
2013 romance films
Films scored by Abhimann Roy